The Bibliographical Society of America (BSA) is a North American organization that fosters the study of books and manuscripts.  It was constituted from the earlier Bibliographical Society of Chicago (created in 1899) as the national membership began to exceed local membership.  The organization publishes the scholarly journal Papers of the Bibliographical Society of America as well as book on topics of bibliographic interest.

Annotated Bibliography
 In an essay published in Libraries, Books and Culture, Wayne A.  Wiegand detailed the politics surrounding the formation of the BSA through its split from the American Library Association and the reconstituting of the Bibliographical Society of Chicago into a national organization.

 The University of Chicago Press publishes the Papers of the Bibliographical Society of America and mainitains access to past issues dating back to the beginning of the journal in 1904.

Three retrospectives of the organization have been published in the Papers in 1941, 1979, and 2004.  The latter two became the basis for entries in the 1969 and 2018 editions of the Encyclopedia of Library and Information Sciences, respectively.

External Links
Homepage of the Bibliographical Society of America

Cites

Organizations established in 1904
Organizations based in New York City
Education in New York City
Culture of New York City
Learned societies of the United States
History of books
Bibliography
1904 establishments in New York (state)